ECAM may refer to:

 Electronic centralised aircraft monitor, a system that monitors aircraft functions and relays them to the pilots
 Evidence-Based Complementary and Alternative Medicine, a medical journal
 École Catholique des Arts et Métiers, an engineering school in Lyon, France
 ECAM Rennes - Louis de Broglie, an engineering school in Rennes, France
 The Madrid Film School, a film school in Madrid, Spain

See also